Chi Minghua (born March 6, 1962) is a Chinese football coach and former international football player. As a player, he spent the majority of his career playing as a defender for Guangdong football team while internationally he represented China in the 1984 Asian Cup.

Playing career
Chi Minghua started his career playing for the Guangdong football team where he started his career in the 1979 Chinese league season and saw his club win the league title. His performances for Guangdong would soon see him included into the Chinese national team where he would take part in the 1984 AFC Asian Cup and aided China to a runners-up spot to Saudi Arabia in a 2-0 defeat. When he returned to Guangdong he would win the 1983 Southern Group title with Guangdong and go on captain the side for the next several seasons. By 1994 the Chinese league became completely professional and despite nearing the end of career he carried on playing for the club until the 1997 league season before he moved to second tier club Yunnan Hongta F.C. where he ended his career.

Management career
After retiring Chi would eventually return to football when he joined Chinese football club playing in the 2005–06 Hong Kong First Division League Dongguan Dongcheng where he was their General Manager for a brief period. Chi would then go into management when he had the chance to manage Guangdong Women's and Guangdong Women's youth team in 2009.

Career statistics

International statistics

Honours

Player
Guangdong
Chinese Jia-A League: 1979
Chinese Jia-A League: 1983 (Southern Group)

References

External links
Player profile at sodasoccer.com

1962 births
Living people
People from Meixian District
Chinese footballers
Footballers from Meizhou
China international footballers
Yunnan Hongta players
Chinese football managers
Hakka sportspeople
Association football defenders